Kasim Adams Nuhu (born 22 June 1995), also known simply as Kasim, or in Switzerland better known as Adams Nuhu, is a Ghanaian professional footballer who plays as a centre-back for Swiss Super League club Basel, on loan from 1899 Hoffenheim. He also represents the Ghana national team.

Club career
Born in Kumasi, Kasim graduated with local Medeama SC's youth setup, and made his senior debut on 14 April 2013, coming on as a second-half substitute in a 0–0 away draw against Heart of Lions FC in the Ghana Premier League. In November he moved to CD Leganés, being assigned to the club's youth setup.

Real Mallorca
In January 2014 Kasim joined RCD Mallorca in a three-year loan deal, with a €200,000 buyout clause, and was initially assigned to the reserves in the Tercera División. He appeared in 17 matches during the campaign and scored two goals (against Penya Ciutadella and CD Atlético Rafal), as his side returned to the Segunda División B at first attempt.

On 28 September 2014, Kasim played his first match as a professional, starting and scoring a brace in a 3–3 home draw against FC Barcelona B in the Segunda División. He was subsequently made a starter by manager Valeri Karpin, overtaking Agus and Joan Truyols.

Kasim lost his first-team place after the arrival of new manager Fernando Vázquez, being demoted to fifth choice. On 25 August 2016, he was loaned from Mallorca to Swiss club BSC Young Boys, for one year.

Young Boys
Now known as Nuhu, he was part of the Young Boys squad that won the 2017–18 Swiss Super League, their first league title for 32 years.

1899 Hoffenheim
On 25 July 2018, it was announced that Kasim would join 1899 Hoffenheim on a five-year contract.

Loan to Fortuna Düsseldorf 
On 8 August 2019, he was loaned out to Fortuna Düsseldorf until the end of 2019–20 season.

Loan to Basel 
On 21 July 2022, Kasim joined Basel on loan, with an option to make the move permanent. Now better known as Adams Nuhu, he joined Basel's first team for their 2022–23 season under head coach Alexander Frei. Adams Nuhu made his debut for his new club in the home game in the St. Jakob-Park on 24 July as Basel played a 1–1 draw against Servette.

International career
On 12 November 2017, Kasim scored on his international debut for Ghana against Saudi Arabia.

Personal life
Kasim is the younger brother of Ashanti Gold SC defender Ahmed Adams.

Career statistics

Club

International

Scores and results list Ghana's goal tally first, score column indicates score after each Nuhu goal.

Honours
Young Boys
Swiss Super League: 2017–18

References

External links
Mallorca official profile 

1995 births
Living people
Footballers from Kumasi
Ghanaian footballers
Ghana international footballers
Association football defenders
Segunda División players
Segunda División B players
Tercera División players
RCD Mallorca B players
RCD Mallorca players
Swiss Super League players
BSC Young Boys players
Bundesliga players
TSG 1899 Hoffenheim players
Fortuna Düsseldorf players
FC Basel players
Ghanaian expatriate footballers
Ghanaian expatriate sportspeople in Spain
Ghanaian expatriate sportspeople in Switzerland
Expatriate footballers in Spain
Expatriate footballers in Switzerland
Expatriate footballers in Germany
2019 Africa Cup of Nations players